Enzo Agustín Ritacco (born 5 May 1999) is an Argentine professional footballer who plays as a midfielder for Acassuso.

Career
Ritacco's career began with Primera B Metropolitana's Acassuso. He was selected for his professional debut by manager Rodolfo Della Picca in October 2018, as he came off the substitutes bench in a league victory in Dock Sud over San Telmo.

Career statistics
.

References

External links

1999 births
Living people
Place of birth missing (living people)
Argentine footballers
Association football midfielders
Primera B Metropolitana players
Club Atlético Acassuso footballers